, also known as Judy Totoya is a game designer and artist. He designed the character Miles "Tails" Prower in an internal contest hosted by Sonic Team. He originally named the character "Miles Prower", however SEGA wanted to call the character "Tails". SEGA and Yamaguchi reached a compromise on his name, with "Miles Prower" being the character's full legal name and "Tails" being his nickname.

His main work was that of both creating and designing Tails as well as being the Chief Artist and one of the Zone artists in Sonic the Hedgehog 2.

He also worked as the Special Stage Designer in Sonic CD and on other Sega related games.

Production history
 Cyborg Hunter (1988) — Designer
 Phantasy Star II (1989) — Mechanical Design
 Last Battle (1989) — Special Designer under the name Judy Totoya
 Sorcerian (1990) - Graphic Designer for the Mega Drive version under the name Judy Totoya
 Advanced Daisenryaku (1991) - Unit Design - Land Unit for the Mega Drive version under the name Judy★Totoya
 Sonic the Hedgehog 2 (1992) — Character Design, Chief Artist, Zone Artist
 Kid Chameleon (1992) — Art
 Sonic the Hedgehog CD (1993) — Special Stage Designer
 Magic Knight Rayearth (1995) — Art Director
 Wachenröder (1998) — Character Design

References

Living people
Video game artists
Japanese video game designers
Year of birth missing (living people)